Awasthiella is a genus of fungi in the family Verrucariaceae. A monotypic genus, it contains the single species Awasthiella indica.

References

Verrucariales
Lichen genera
Monotypic Eurotiomycetes genera
Taxa described in 1980